Gloria Dawn (born July 27, 1940) was a Canadian model who appeared in numerous softcore men's magazines in the 1960s.
 She began her career in January 1962, and modeled for photographers Peter Gowland, Ron Vogel, Donald G. Klumpp, Sam Wu, Elmer Batters, and Keith Bernard among others. She retired from modeling in August 1963 but her pictures appeared in publications until 1968.  In recent years, her photos have appeared in art books and in one volume of a series on the history of men's magazines.

Ms. Dawn worked for eight months as a blond and usually “Gloria Dawn” was the name accompanying pictures taken of her as a blond.  She worked for three months as a brunette and one month as a strawberry blond.  In her brunette and her strawberry blond pictures, the name “Gloria Dawn” was never used.  Keith Bernard identified her as “Susan Norman”, and in publications using photos by Elmer Batters, she was given a different name whenever she appeared.

While a model she lived at the Hollywood Studio Club where her roommate was Adrienne Ellis.

Her real name was Gloria Moeser but in 1965 she changed her first name to Shannon, thereby becoming Shannon Dawn Moeser. In September 1965, she enrolled in a BA program at Simon Fraser University and obtained her PhD in 1971 from McGill University.

References

External links
  Blog
  Photos
  Discussion Thread

1940 births
Living people
Canadian female adult models
People from Saskatoon